Duy Quang (né Pham Duy Quang; 4 November 1950 in Hanoi – 19 December 2012 in San Jose, California) was a Vietnamese American singer, best remembered for singing pop music from Vietnam in genre of yellow music, most notably composed by his father Phạm Duy.

References 

1950 births
2012 deaths
Vietnamese singers
American people of Vietnamese descent